Daniel Sargent may refer to:
 Daniel Sargent (politician) (1764–1842), American merchant and politician in Boston, Massachusetts
 Daniel Sargent Sr. (1730–1806), his father, American merchant in Massachusetts 
 Daniel Wycliffe Sargent (1850–1902), British explorer of Africa
 Daniel Sargent (judoka), British judoka